John Michael Haiman (born 1946) is an American linguist and professor at Macalester College. He has done fieldwork on the Hua language of Papua New-Guinea and has published on Khmer, Rhaeto-Romance and Germanic linguistics. In 1989 he received a Guggenheim fellowship for the study of sarcasm.

References

External links 
 Publications by John Haiman

1946 births
Linguists from the United States
Living people
20th-century linguists
Linguists of Papuan languages
Linguists of Trans–New Guinea languages
Linguists of Southeast Asian languages
Linguists of Kainantu–Goroka languages